Movement in Still Life is the third studio album by American electronica artist BT. It was released in the United Kingdom on October 8, 1999, and a different version released in the United States in 2000. A transition towards hip hop, it includes the singles "Godspeed", "Dreaming", and in the US, "Never Gonna Come Back Down". The original cover art is a photogram, Invocation, by Adam Fuss.

Background
Movement in Still Life was completely redesigned in the US for an American audience. This version has several minutes cut from each track and is presented in an unmixed manner with breaks in between songs. The tracks were also rearranged: The original closer, "Satellite", was moved to the middle and replaced by the hip hop track "Love on Haight Street", while the opening song was also moved to the centre of the record and replaced by "Madskills Mic-Chekka" and the US single "Never Gonna Come Back Down", featuring Mike Doughty of Soul Coughing on vocals. "Ride", "The Hip Hop Phenomenon", "Giving Up the Ghost" and "Namistai" were replaced with "Shame" and "Smartbomb"; the latter of which was later sampled for *NSYNC's international hit "Pop", also produced by BT. The album's Australian version uses the UK track listing, but replaces "The Hip Hop Phenomenon" with "Never Gonna Come Back Down", mixing it into its surrounding tracks with transitions.

A song called "Far From Goodbye (Later My Love)" was released in a sampler of the album in 1999, but never released officially.

There are two versions of the album on vinyl: a double LP, with a variant of the UK track listing; and a four-LP version with eight tracks, with one song per side, featuring extended mixes. Several of these extended mixes were later added to a Special Edition double-CD set from Hong Kong, which also included other extended mixes.

Singles
Movement in Still Life ties These Hopeful Machines with the most singles BT ever released from one album, largely due to the differences between the UK and US versions. Tracks like "Godspeed" and "Mercury and Solace" did well in the UK, but would not fare well on US radio, where "Never Gonna Come Back Down" and "Shame" performed well on American alternative rock stations. "Smartbomb" was used in several films, most notably in 3000 Miles to Graceland, and was used in the video game FreQuency. The Plump DJs remix of "Smartbomb" and "Hip Hop Phenomenon" were featured in the video game SSX Tricky. The Plump DJs remix also appears in Wipeout Fusion.  A remix of "Never Gonna Come Back Down" was featured in FIFA Football 2002. "Ride" was originally released in 1998 as a single by 2 Phat Cunts, a group comprising BT and Sasha.

The track "Satellite" contains excerpts from the crew of NASA space shuttle mission STS-51-A during their post-mission press conference.

Track listing

2x vinyl version

Personnel
 BT – all other vocals, instruments and programming

Musicians
 Peanut Butter Wolf – record scratching on "Movement in Still Life" and "Love on Haight Street"
 Planet Asia – vocals on "Madskillz-Mic Chekka"
 Hutchi – vocals on "Madskillz-Mic Chekka"
 Rasco – vocals on "Madskillz-Mic Chekka", "Smartbomb" and "Love on Haight Street"
 DJ Davey Dave – "cuts" and "scratching" on "Madskillz-Mic Chekka" and "Smartbomb"
 Jan Johnston – vocals on "Mercury and Solace" and "Sunblind", backing vocals on "Dreaming"
 DJ Rap – vocals on "Giving Up the Ghost"
 Kirsty Hawkshaw – vocals on "Dreaming" and "Running Down the Way Up"
 Scott Frassetto – live drums on "Satellite"
 Richard Fortus – guitars on "Shame", "Running Down the Way Up" and "Smartbomb"
 Mike Doughty – vocals on "Never Gonna Come Back Down"
 Fifty Grand – vocals on "Love on Haight Street"

Production
 Sasha – co-production on "Ride"
 Adam Freeland – co-production on "Madskillz-Mic Chekka"
 Kevin Beber – co-production on "Madskillz-Mic Chekka"
 Tsunami One (Adam Freeland & Kevin Beber) – co-production on "The Hip Hop Phenomenon"
 Paul van Dyk – co-production on "Namasté"
 Hybrid – co-production on "Running Down the Way Up" and co-credited with "Godspeed"

Charts

Notes

References

1999 albums
2000 albums
BT (musician) albums
Nettwerk Records albums
Breakbeat albums